Craig Edward Mabbitt (born April 9, 1987) is an American singer and the lead vocalist for the rock band Escape the Fate. He was formerly the lead vocalist for the bands Blessthefall and The Word Alive. He is also the current lead vocalist of his side-project band The Dead Rabbitts.

Early life 

In his early childhood, Mabbitt required the frequent and scheduled use of a nebulizer as a result of severe asthma. He also had to attend a special class due to a speech disorder, but nevertheless he overcame these setbacks, and in his adolescent years, realized his "dream of becoming a singer in a rock band."

Career

Blessthefall (2003–2008) 

While with Blessthefall, Mabbitt released two self-released EPs and one full-length album. Their first full album, His Last Walk, was released on April 10, 2007 on Science Records/Ferret Music. It produced four singles; the last of which, "Rise Up", was released after he left the band, and he does not appear in the video.

In the middle of their 2007 European Tour with Silverstein and The Vincent Black Shadow, Mabbitt left the band for personal reasons, and was replaced by Beau Bokan, the former lead vocalist for Take the Crown.

Both Craig Mabbitt and Jonny Craig filled in for A Skylit Drive on clean and unclean positions after leaving their bands, during their tour in late 2007.

The Word Alive (2008) 

Mabbitt founded the Arizona-based metalcore band The Word Alive in 2008 as a side-project while also performing in Escape the Fate. He and the group recorded songs for an EP that was never officially released, and November 2008 the band dropped Mabbitt, claiming complications due to his involvement with Escape the Fate. Mabbitt was replaced by Tyler Smith, formerly the bassist of Greeley Estates and singer/keyboardist of In Fear and Faith; since then, The Word Alive has released an EP and five albums.

Escape the Fate (2008–present) 

After singer Ronnie Radke was sentenced to five years' probation for battery charges (and then two years' imprisonment for failure to report to his probation officer) Escape the Fate turned to Mabbitt, who had played with Escape the Fate on the Black on Black Tour while with Blessthefall. After several trial shows he became the official new singer and they entered the studio to record their second full-length album This War Is Ours, which was released on October 21, 2008. It was the first Escape the Fate album with Mabbitt as singer; the album was a commercial success, entering at No. 35 on the Billboard 200 and selling 13,000 copies in the first week.

The third studio album from the band and second to feature Mabbitt was Escape the Fate which was released on November 2, 2010 and is the band's most successful album to date charting No. 25 on the Billboard 200, No. 1 at Hard Rock Albums, No. 14 in a Rock Albums, No. 13 in Alternative and Independent charts and No. 118 in Digital Albums Chart.

On May 14, 2013 the band released their fourth studio album and third with Mabbitt Ungrateful. On October 30, 2015 the band released their fifth studio album and fourth with Mabbitt "Hate Me". The band released their sixth studio album, I Am Human on March 30, 2018. On April 16, 2021 the band released their seventh studio album and sixth with Mabbitt Chemical Warfare.

The Dead Rabbitts (2011–present) 

In late December 2011, Mabbitt announced an upcoming side project, along with a new Escape the Fate album. He revealed that a single would be released in February 2012, and the album will be produced by Caleb Shomo of Beartooth and will be a reminiscent of his music from Blessthefall and The Word Alive. Mabbitt was set to release his debut solo album April 9, stating "what better day to release your album than on your birthday?" 

On Facebook, Mabbitt announced that if his official Facebook page got to 50,000 likes, he would release a new song. On his Twitter, he revealed that he was working on a song titled "Are You Still On Drugs", which may be related to a song titled "Are You on drugs" that he wrote back when he was in The Word Alive.

When the page got to about 49,500 likes, he revealed the title and lyrics for the upcoming song, titled "Edge of Reality". "Edge of Reality" was released the moment the page reached 50,000 likes.

Mabbitt posted a status update on his Facebook page informing that if the page got up to 75,000 likes, he would release another new song for his fans from his upcoming solo album. He also revealed a part of the lyrics of the upcoming song. Along with this announcement, he revealed an upcoming video for "Edge of Reality". On March 30, he announced the name of the upcoming EP titled Edge of Reality under the band name The Dead Rabbitts.

On April 9, the EP or full length wasn't released on Mabbitt's birthday as expected, so instead, he released a new song on YouTube, titled "World of Disaster", along with the final version of "Edge of Reality" on YouTube, and the "Edge of Reality – Single" on iTunes as well.

Mabbitt also announced that he plans on releasing the "Edge of Reality EP" once 100% is met on the scale for the pledge, so fans can pledge now, which means pre-ordering the EP, for just digital download or also with the physical copy as well.

Mabbitt has announced that he plans on releasing the Edge of Reality EP on October 19, 2012. He has streamed a new track only for the people who pledged, it's entitled "Nuthin But a Reject". Another new track was released online by Mabbitt entitled "Make Me Believe It" featuring Caleb Shomo of Attack Attack! 

On October 3, the goal was met for the pledge and for this Mabbitt released another track entitled "Sleep The Night Away" online.

In late 2013, Mabbitt and the band announced the release of their full-length debut album sometime in 2014. In December, they began recording songs with Andrew Wade, On May 16. the band released their first single "My Only Regret" from their debut album Shapeshifter, which was released on July 1, 2014. The album debuted at No. 127 on the Billboard 200. The band released their second studio album, This Emptiness on April 17, 2017.

On October 25, 2019, the band released "Dead By Daylight", a single written by Mabbitt with his son, Mizo, as a guest vocalist It is based on the horror-survival video game, Dead by Daylight. On December 6, 2019, the band's second EP, Break the Static, was released.

Solo career (2020) 

Mabbitt released his first solo song "Never Be" through SoundCloud on April 9, 2020. The song was released to celebrate his 33rd birthday.

Discography 

Solo career
 "Never Be" (Single, 2020)
 "One More Light" (Linkin Park cover, 2020)
 "Hollywood's Bleeding" (Post Malone cover, 2020)

Blessthefall
 Black Rose Dying (ЕР) (2005)
 Blessthefall (ЕР) (2006)
 His Last Walk (2007)

The Word Alive
 The Word Alive (ЕР) (2008)

Escape the Fate
 This War Is Ours (2008)
 Escape the Fate (2010)
 Ungrateful (2013)
 Hate Me (2015)
 I Am Human (2018)
 Chemical Warfare (2021)

The Dead Rabbitts
 Edge of Reality (ЕР) (2012)
 Shapeshifter (2014)
 This Emptiness (2017)
 Break the Static (ЕР) (2019)
 Rumination (2022)

Collaborations

References 

1987 births
Living people
American male singers
Musicians from Scottsdale, Arizona
American heavy metal singers
Escape the Fate members
Musicians from Glendale, Arizona
21st-century American singers

sv:Craig Mabbitt